The  is a multi-purpose public cultural facility in Akita, Japan. It hosted the 2001 World Games for powerlifting and bodybuilding. The main concert hall has a seating capacity of 1,188. Notable past performers include TM Revolution and Helloween.

Events at Akitashi Bunka Kaikan
 Keith Jarrett - 23 January 1984
 Yngwie Malmsteen - 19 March 1994
 Julia Fordham - 11 August 1994
 Skid Row - 17 June 1995
 Yngwie Malmsteen - 25 September 1995
 Helloween - 21 September 1996
 Bodybuilding at the 2001 World Games - 18–19 August 2001
 Powerlifting at the 2001 World Games - 20–21 August 2001
 Quintet (grappling) -30 November 2019

Facilities
Large hall
Small hall
Exhibition halls
Conference rooms
Practice rooms
Rehearsal room
Nursery room
Tea room
Cafe

See also
Akita Prefectural Hall

References

2001 World Games
Concert halls in Japan
Buildings and structures in Akita (city)
Sports venues in Akita Prefecture
Music venues completed in 1980
1980 establishments in Japan